A suffix is part of a word; an affix that follows the morphemes to which it can attach.
 Possessive suffix, a suffix used in word formation for creation of various possessive forms

Suffix may also refer to:

 Suffix (name), the style at the end of a person's name which gives additional identifying information about the person
 Suffix (computer science),  the last part of a string of characters
 Suffix notation, a notation for manipulating vector quantities, also known as index notation
 Suffix array, an array of integers giving the starting positions of suffixes of a string in lexicographical order
 Suffix tree, a data structure that presents the suffixes of a given string in a way that allows for a particularly fast implementation of many important string operations

See also
 Prefix (disambiguation)